Jagati railway station is a railway station in Kushtia, Bangladesh. It was the first railway station in present-day Bangladesh.

History
Kushtia's Jagati Railway Station has been a witness to the history of the railways in Bangladesh. This is the country's first railway station. During the British period, this station was opened in 1862 to travel from Sealdah to Kushtia. In 1844, R. M Stephenson formed the East India Railway Company to build a railway line from Howrah near Kolkata to the coal-mining-rich Raniganj town of West Bengal. In 1854, the company opened a 38-km long rail line from Howrah to Hooghly. Then on September 29, 1862, the Eastern Bengal Railway opened the rail line from Kolkata to Ranaghat. Extending this line, a 53.11-km Broad gauge railway line section was unveiled on November 15 that year until Jagati in Kushtia. At that time, the first railway station of East Bengal, Jagati, was established. Later, in order to facilitate the communication between Dhaka and Kolkata, on January 1, 1871, a railway line was started from Jagati to Goalundo ghat on the banks of the Padma river in the present Rajbari District. At that time, people used to take a train from Kolkata and go to Goalundo ghat via Jagati station.

Service
Trains that run through Jagati Railway Station are mentioned below:
Modhumoti express
Tungipara express
Nakshikantha express
Local trains

References

Railway stations in Kushtia District
Railway stations opened in 1862
1862 establishments in British India